Givi Aleksandrovich Kartozia (29 March 1929 – 3 April 1998) was a Middleweight Greco-Roman wrestler from Georgia. He won an Olympic gold medal in 1956 and a world title in 1953, 1955 and 1958. Domestically he was the Soviet middleweight champion in 1952–55, and placed second in 1956 and third in 1950 and 1951. For the 1960 Olympics he moved up to the light-heavyweight class and won a bronze medal. He retired soon after the Olympics and since 1966 acted as an international wrestling referee. He died in 1998, aged 69, and starting from 2010 an annual international wrestling tournament has been held in Tbilisi in his honor.

References

External links
 

1929 births
1998 deaths
Sportspeople from Batumi
Soviet male sport wrestlers
Olympic wrestlers of the Soviet Union
Wrestlers at the 1956 Summer Olympics
Wrestlers at the 1960 Summer Olympics
Male sport wrestlers from Georgia (country)
Olympic gold medalists for the Soviet Union
Olympic bronze medalists for the Soviet Union
Olympic medalists in wrestling
Medalists at the 1960 Summer Olympics
Medalists at the 1956 Summer Olympics
World Wrestling Championships medalists
Honoured Masters of Sport of the USSR
Recipients of the Order of Honor (Georgia)

Recipients of the Order of the Red Banner of Labour